The American Journal of Clinical Pathology is a monthly peer-reviewed medical journal covering clinical pathology. It was established in 1931 and is published by Oxford University Press. It is the official journal of the American Society for Clinical Pathology and the Academy of Clinical Laboratory Physicians and Scientists. The editor-in-chief is Steven H. Kroft (Medical College of Wisconsin). According to the Journal Citation Reports, the journal has a 2020 impact factor of 2.493.

References

External links

Clinical pathology
Pathology journals
Oxford University Press academic journals
Publications established in 1931
Monthly journals
Academic journals associated with learned and professional societies of the United States
English-language journals